Dunlap Archeological District is a registered historic district near Dunlap, Ohio, listed in the National Register of Historic Places on October 21, 1975.  It does not contain any contributing buildings.

Historic uses 
Village Site
Fortification

Notes 

Archaeological sites in Ohio
Archaeological sites on the National Register of Historic Places in Ohio
Historic districts on the National Register of Historic Places in Ohio
Archaeological sites in Hamilton County, Ohio
National Register of Historic Places in Hamilton County, Ohio